B. Bix Aliu is an American diplomat who is the nominee to be the next U.S Ambassador to Montenegro.

Early life and education
Aliu holds a Medical Degree from the University of Pristina in Kosovo, and a Master of Strategic Studies Degree from the U.S. Army War College.

Career
Aliu is a career member of the Senior Foreign Service, with the rank of Minster-Counselor. Aliu most recently served as Chargé d’affaires, ad interim of the U.S. Embassy in Budapest, Hungary. He also served as the Deputy Chief of Mission of the U.S. Embassy in Poland and was Chargé d’affaires, ad interim there for all of 2021. Aliu previously served as the Consul General of the U.S. Consulate General in Krakow, Poland. Other assignments include service as Deputy Chief of Mission of the U.S. Embassy in Podgorica, Montenegro, Public Diplomacy Officer in Tirana, Albania, Deputy Orientation Coordinator at the United States Department of State’s National Foreign Affairs Training Center, and serving in Congress as a Pearson Congressional Fellow.

Nominee as Ambassador to Montenegro
On September 16, 2022, President Joe Biden nominated Aliu to be the next ambassador to Montenegro. His nomination expired at the end of the year and was returned to President Biden on January 3, 2023.

President Biden renominated Aliu the same day. His nomination is pending before the Senate Foreign Relations Committee.

Awards and recognitions
Aliu is the recipient of multiple performance awards from the Department of State. Aliu was also decorated with the Honoris Gratia Medal given out in Krakow during his tenure there, the city’s highest honor, for his work in advancing economic and cultural ties between the United States and the city.

Personal life
Aliu speaks Montenegrin, Polish, Serbo-Croatian, Macedonian and Albanian.

References

Year of birth missing (living people)
American diplomats
United States Foreign Service personnel
University of Pristina alumni
United States Army War College alumni